Sayghan District, also spelt Saighan, Seyghan and other variant spellings, and also known as Saraik or Sarayek, and other variant spellings of this name, is an administrative district of Bamyan province, Afghanistan.

History and geography
Sayghan District was created in 2005 from part of Kahmard District, and until 2004 was part of Baghlan Province. Sayghan is the largest town and the administrative centre.

Neighbouring districts are Bamyan District to the south, Yakawlang District to the west, Kahmard District to the north, and Shibar District to the east.

Climate
Sayghan's Köppen climate classification is Dsb, a warm continental climate with dry summers.

Economics 
The Da Eman coal deposits are located in Sayghan District, but by 2008 had not yet been fully commercially exploited.

The majority of economic activity is agriculture: farming in the valleys, mostly wheat, potatoes and barley; and stock, raising mostly sheep, donkeys and goats.

See also 
 Districts of Afghanistan

References 

Districts of Bamyan Province
Hazarajat